Green River Lake State Park is a park located near Campbellsville, Kentucky in Taylor County.

Activities and amenities

References

External links
 Green River Lake State Park Kentucky State Parks

State parks of Kentucky
Protected areas of Taylor County, Kentucky
Campbellsville, Kentucky
Green River (Kentucky)